Pelophryne penrissenensis, also known as Penrissen dwarf toad, is a species of toad in the family Bufonidae. Its actual range might be wider and extend into nearby Kalimantan (Indonesia). It is the sister taxon of Pelophryne signata.

Description
Two adult males in the type series measure  and a single adult female  in snout–vent length. The overall appearance is moderately slender. The snout is truncate. The tympanum is visible, oval in shape. The forelimbs are thin and long; the hindlimbs are slender and moderately long. Both the fingers and toes have fleshy webbing characteristic to all Pelophryne. The finger and toe tips bear small discs. Skin is dorsally and laterally scattered with tubercles of various sizes. Colouration is clay brown, with darker spots. There is a dark brown interorbital triangle and a dark brown triangle from the mid-trunk to above the cloaca; together, these form a light hourglass pattern. In some individuals, the dark dorsal pattern is reduced into scattered dots.

Habitat and conservation
Specimens have been spotted on leaves, on and around rocks, always < above ground. It probably breeds by larval development, as other Pelophryne. It is sympatric with Pelophryne signata, but less abundant.

Although this species is only known from one locality, it is relatively common there, not facing known threats, and believed to have a stable population. Some habitat conversion has occurred at the lower end of its altitudinal range, but higher up its habitat is considered safe. Hence, it has been assessed as a species of "least concern" by IUCN. Mount Penrissen is an Important Bird Area but enjoys no formal protection.

References

Endemic fauna of Borneo
Amphibians of Borneo
Endemic fauna of Malaysia
Amphibians of Malaysia
Amphibians described in 2017
Taxa named by Masafumi Matsui
Taxa named by Kanto Nishikawa
penrissenensis